Devil's Foot Cemetery Archeological Site, RI-694 is an archaeological site in North Kingstown, Rhode Island. The site was added to the National Register of Historic Places in 1984. 

In 1893, James Newell Arnold had written about Nicholas Hart unearthing graves at this location in 1868 and he sold the "relics" found on the skeleton, which included 27 rings and a copper neck plate inscribed "I.H.S." (most likely of Jesuit origins).

See also
 National Register of Historic Places listings in Washington County, Rhode Island

References

Cemeteries on the National Register of Historic Places in Rhode Island
North Kingstown, Rhode Island
Buildings and structures in Washington County, Rhode Island
National Register of Historic Places in Washington County, Rhode Island